Sheikha Mishaal bint Fahd Al Saud (1958 – 15 July 1977) was a member of the House of Saud who was executed by shooting for committing adultery in 1977, at the age of 19. She was a daughter of Prince Fahd bin Muhammad and a granddaughter of Prince Muhammad bin Abdulaziz, a son of King Abdulaziz of Saudi Arabia and the older and only full brother of King Khalid.

Background
Princess Mishaal's family sent her, at her own request, to Beirut, Lebanon, to attend school. While there, she fell in love with a man, Khaled al Sha'er Muhalhal, the nephew of Ali Hassan al Shaer, the Saudi ambassador in Lebanon, and they began an affair. Upon their return to Saudi Arabia, it emerged that they had conspired to meet alone on several occasions and a charge of adultery was brought against them. She attempted to fake her own drowning and was caught trying to escape from Saudi Arabia with Khaled. Although the Princess was disguised as a man, she was recognized by a passport examiner at Jeddah airport. She was subsequently returned to her family. Under the Sharia law current in Saudi Arabia, a person can be convicted of adultery only by the testimony of four adult male witnesses to the act of sexual penetration, or by their own admission of guilt, stating four times in court "I have committed adultery." Her family urged her not to confess but instead merely to promise never to see her lover again. On her return to the courtroom, she repeated her confession: "I have committed adultery. I have committed adultery. I have committed adultery."

Execution
On 15 July 1977, both Mishaal and Khaled were publicly executed in Jeddah by the side of the Queen's Building in the park. She was blindfolded, made to kneel, and executed on the explicit instructions of her grandfather, a senior member of the royal family, for the dishonor that she had brought on her clan. Khaled, after being forced to watch her execution, was beheaded with a sword by, it is believed, one of the princess' male relatives rather than by a professional executioner. Severing his head took five blows. Both executions were conducted near the palace in Jeddah, not in Deera Square.

Death of a Princess documentary
Independent film producer Antony Thomas came to Saudi Arabia and interviewed numerous people about the princess' story. He was met by conflicting stories, which later became the subject matter of a British documentary, Death of a Princess. The film was scheduled to show on 9 April 1980 on the ITV television network and then a month later on the public television network PBS in the United States. Both broadcasts were met with livid protests followed by strong diplomatic, economic and political pressure from the Saudis to cancel these broadcasts. After having failed to get the British broadcast cancelled, King Khalid expelled the British ambassador from Saudi Arabia.

In May 1980, attention then shifted to PBS where their officials endured a month of mounting pressure from corporations and politicians. A major PBS sponsor, the Mobil Oil Corporation, took out a full-page ad in The New York Times op-ed page opposing the film and declaring it jeopardized U.S.-Saudi relations. After some stalling, it was eventually broadcast by the PBS program World in most of the US on 12 May 1980, although some PBS stations did not do so. For example, in South Carolina, the PBS affiliate cancelled broadcast of the film, a decision influenced by fact that the then US Ambassador to Saudi Arabia, John C. West, had formerly been the state's governor. In 2005, PBS aired Death Of A Princess on Frontline, the successor to World, to commemorate the 25th anniversary of the original broadcast.

King Khalid was said to have offered $11 million to the network to suppress the film.

According to director Antony Thomas, there was no trial or official execution:

David Fanning, co-writer and executive producer of Death of a Princess, added:

See also
 Executions in Saudi Arabia
 2011 Saudi Arabian protests
 Dina Ali Lasloom
 Sara bint Talal bin Abdulaziz Al Saud
 Samar Badawi
 Hamza Kashgari
 Manal al-Sharif

References

External links
 Princess executed for eloping Article in The Observer, 22 January 1978

Mishaal
Mishaal
1958 births
1977 deaths
Mishaal
Mishaal
Mishaal
People executed by Saudi Arabia by firearm
People executed for adultery
Mishaal